Men's Giant Slalom World Cup 1979/1980

Final point standings

In Men's Giant Slalom World Cup 1979/80 the best 5 results count. Eight racers had a point deduction, which are given in brackets. Ingemar Stenmark won the cup with maximum points. He won his sixth Giant Slalom World Cup in a row.

References
 fis-ski.com

World Cup
FIS Alpine Ski World Cup men's giant slalom discipline titles